Leroy & Stitch  is a 2006 American animated science fiction comedy television film produced by Walt Disney Television Animation. It is the third and final sequel film of the 2002 animated feature film Lilo & Stitch, serving as the series finale to Lilo & Stitch: The Series. It also concluded the main continuity of the Lilo & Stitch franchise where Lilo Pelekai is a main character and Hawaii is the main setting. It is the last Western-made work in the franchise—not including crossover appearances—until the 2022 children's book Agent Stitch: A Study in Slime and the franchise's last Western-animated production to date. The film debuted on Disney Channel on June 23, 2006, and was also aired on Toon Disney on June 26, 2006.

While the film received mixed reviews, it was nominated for the 2007 Golden Reel Award by the Motion Picture Sound Editors, which ultimately went to Disneytoon's direct-to-video film The Fox and the Hound 2.

Plot
With their mission to capture all the experiments and repurpose them on Earth completed, Lilo, Stitch, Jumba and Pleakley are honored as heroes by the Galactic Alliance. Jumba is given the confiscated key to his laboratory again, Pleakley is offered a post as chairman of Earth Studies at G.A.C.C. (Galactic Alliance Community College), and Stitch is made the Captain of the Galactic Armada and commander of the newly commissioned BRB-9000 (Big Red Battleship 9000). Lilo is made the Galactic Federation's ambassador to Earth and sole guardian of the experiments. Before they leave, Lilo gives Jumba her favorite Elvis record, Pleakley a small rock to use as a paperweight, and Stitch a necklace with a Kū tiki.

In his ship, Gantu has decided that since he failed to capture the experiments, except for 625, he will have to break Dr. Hämsterviel out of prison. He takes a two-man space shuttle, leaving 625 alone, and frees Hämsterviel. While they enjoy what they are honored for Jumba, Pleakley, Lilo, and Stitch begins to feel sad and devastated due to being apart from each other and loneliness. After Jumba listens to a song on the Elvis record Lilo gave to him, Gantu and Hämsterviel burst into his lab and Hämsterviel forces Jumba to create an evil twin brother of Stitch, Leroy. Stitch, having been assigned to recapture Hämsterviel, arrives and after a fight, he is defeated when Pleakley appears at an inopportune moment, distracting Stitch long enough for Leroy to detain him in a capsule. Hämsterviel reveals his plans to clone an army of Leroys to conquer the Galactic Alliance. Before leaving for Turo, Hämsterviel locks Stitch, Jumba, and Pleakley in Pleakley's G.A.C.C. vehicle and sends the vessel into a black hole.

On Earth, Lilo decides to contact Stitch. Lilo realizes that the only intergalactic videophone available on the planet is in Gantu's ship. There, she finds 625 and asks to use the videophone, only to find it is not functional. Lilo then names 625 "Reuben", who thereafter consents to help Lilo. Once the videophone is fixed, Lilo contacts the BRB-9000. Leroy impersonates Stitch, using shapeshifting to disguise himself, but the ruse fails when Lilo notices he is not wearing Stitch's necklace. Hämsterviel then commands Leroy to go to Earth and capture all of the other experiments to destroy them. Lilo, realizing Stitch is in danger, asks Reuben for help in fixing Gantu's ship. As the G.A.C.C. vehicle heads towards the black hole, Stitch escapes and frees the others. However, the navigational computer is locked on course for the black hole. When Jumba notes that they can disrupt the event horizon by throwing a small object into the black hole, Stitch takes Pleakley's rock and throws it into the black hole moments before they are sucked in.

On Earth, Leroy obtains Lilo's scrapbook of the experiments and quickly captures all of them, even kidnapping Lilo's rival, Mertle Edmonds, since she is the owner of Experiment 007, Gigi. Lilo and Reuben arrive at Turo, but they are too late, for Hämsterviel has taken over the galaxy, making the Grand Councilwoman his receptionist, and orders Gantu to imprison the duo, but he decides to release them after Hämsterviel fires him for failing to capture any experiments over the past three years. After a close call with several Leroy clones, they are trapped. All seems lost until the G.A.C.C. vehicle suddenly appears. With no time to explain, Lilo, Reuben, and Gantu all climb in and head for Earth. On Earth, Leroy has gathered all the experiments at the Aloha Stadium. The BRB-9000 appears and Hämsterviel prepares to obliterate the experiments, until Lilo, Stitch and the others arrive just in time to destroy the ship's primary cannon. Hämsterviel reveals that he brought along his Leroy army as backup, whereupon an epic battle between them and the experiments begins. Despite some initial victories by the experiments, the Leroys soon gain the upper hand. Jumba remembers that he programmed a secret shutdown command into Leroy: if Elvis Presley's "Aloha 'Oe" is played, he and his clones will deactivate. Stitch appears on stage in his Elvis attire and performs "Aloha 'Oe" with Lilo and Reuben accompanying him, causing the Leroys to have violent seizures and shut down. With his plan foiled again, Hämsterviel is recaptured and sent back to prison.

Back at the Galactic Alliance HQ, the team is honored by the alliance once again. Stitch, Jumba, and Pleakley ask to be allowed to return to Earth with Lilo. The Councilwoman grants this and asks Gantu if he would like to be reinstated as the captain of the armada. Gantu agrees on the condition that Reuben is assigned as his galley officer. Back on Earth, Lilo sets up for one last picture as Mertle arrives with Gigi (during the battle, Mertle was astounded upon discovering Gigi's experiment identity when she revealed her ability to talk). Lilo's last picture in the album is of all of the experiments still on Earth, Mertle, Jumba, Pleakley, Nani, David, and herself. In the film's final scene, Hämsterviel is seen back in prison with Leroy and his clones placed in separate cells surrounding his, who have recovered from their seizures and begin dancing to "Jailhouse Rock". As the credits roll, a full list of Jumba's experiments from 001/Shrink to 626/Stitch with their names as given by Lilo (and other characters in some instances during Lilo & Stitch: The Series) scroll along the left side of the screen.

Cast 
 Chris Sanders as Stitch (Experiment 626), Leroy (Experiment 629)/Leroy Clones
 Daveigh Chase as Lilo Pelekai
 Tia Carrere as Nani Pelekai
 David Ogden Stiers as Dr. Jumba Jookiba
 Kevin McDonald as Agent Wendy Pleakley
 Jeff Bennett as Dr. Hämsterviel, Fibber (Experiment 032), Slick (Experiment 020), Ace (Experiment 262), Remmy (Experiment 276)
 Kevin Michael Richardson as Gantu
 Rob Paulsen as Reuben (Experiment 625), Squeak (Experiment 110), Houdini (Experiment 604), Forehead (Experiment 044)
 Zoe Caldwell as the Grand Councilwoman
 Ving Rhames as Cobra Bubbles
 Liliana Mumy as Mertle Edmonds
 Tara Strong as Angel (Experiment 624), Babyfier (Experiment 151), Belle (Experiment 248), Dupe (Experiment 344), and Pleakley's G.A.C.C. assistant
 Frank Welker as Sparky (Experiment 221), Sprout (Experiment 509), Mr. Stenchy (Experiment 254), Kixx (Experiment 601), Skip (Experiment 089), Holio (Experiment 606), Finder (Experiment 158), Deforestator (Experiment 515), Yin (Experiment 501), Yang (Experiment 502), Tank (Experiment 586), Checkers (Experiment 029), Slugger (Experiment 608), Splodyhead (Experiment 619) (uncredited)
 Tress MacNeille as Bonnie (Experiment 149), Gigi (Experiment 007), Topper (Experiment 025), Felix (Experiment 010), Melty (Experiment 228), Amnesio (Experiment 303), Cannonball (Experiment 520), Richter (Experiment 513), and the G.A.C.C. van-ship's navi-computer
 Nancy Cartwright as Shortstuff (Experiment 297), Phantasmo (Experiment 375) (uncredited)
 Bobcat Goldthwait as Nosy (Experiment 199)
 Rocky McMurray as Clyde (Experiment 150)
 Lili Ishida as Yuki
 Jillian Henry as Elena
 Kali Whitehurst as Teresa
 Debra Rogers as First Officer Ombit
 Doug Stone as Ensign Getco

Production
According to writer-producer Jess Winfield on his TV.com forum thread, Leroy & Stitch was made during the production of the second and final season of Lilo & Stitch: The Series, with production finished in 2005. The film was originally set for a direct-to-video release in the Northern Hemisphere spring of 2006. The animation production was outsourced to Wang Film Productions, a Taiwanese studio that previously worked on some animation for Lilo & Stitch: The Series.

The film marks the third film in the Lilo & Stitch franchise without any involvement from creators Chris Sanders and Dean DeBlois (besides Sanders providing the voices of Stitch, Leroy, and the latter's clones), as they would leave Disney for DreamWorks Animation to write and direct How to Train Your Dragon.

Release
Leroy & Stitch debuted on Disney Channel on June 23, 2006 and also aired on Toon Disney on June 26, 2006. It was released on DVD in the United States on June 27, 2006 under Walt Disney Pictures. Bonus features of the DVD include a then-unaired episode of Lilo & Stitch: The Series titled "Link" (in 16:9 widescreen aspect ratio) and a set-top game The Big Red Battleship Flight Simulator. Distributed by Walt Disney Home Entertainment, DVD sales in the United States earned a total of $16,672,732 as of September 2021.

Critical reception
Leroy & Stitch received mixed reviews. Review aggregator Rotten Tomatoes gave the film an approval rating of 40% with an average rating of 5.4/10, based on 5 reviews.

Skyler Miller of AllMovie gave the film a rating of 3½ out of 5 stars, praising the voice acting, Elvis Presley songs, and "[the] fast-moving plot that mixes frenetic action, sentimentality, and a few laughs." Miller wrote, "While [Leroy & Stitch is] not nearly as engaging or emotionally rich as the original [Lilo & Stitch] film that inspired it [...] all in all, Leroy & Stitch is a fitting wrap-up to an enjoyable animated series."

Edward Perkis of CinemaBlend gave the film a rating of 1 out of 5 stars, stating the film is "just another direct-to-video sequel of Disney with no unusual stuff in it," and further uplifted and preferred the original film.

Common Sense Media (CSM) gave the film's quality 4 out of 5 stars and applicable for ages 5 above based on 10 reviews from both parents and children.

In 2019, Petrana Radulovic of Polygon ranked Leroy & Stitch ninth out of twenty-six films on her list of direct-to-video sequels, prequels, and "mid-quels" to Disney animated films, one rank higher than Stitch! The Movie. Despite criticizing Leroy & Stitch for focusing more on the aliens and space over the "charming" characters like with Stitch! The Movie, she ranked the finale film higher than the pilot film because of all the now-united 626 experiments' "wacky and really specific powers", stating that "[w]e get to see what they've all been up to after acclimating to life on Hawaii[...], and see them in action in the final battle." In a similar list in 2020, Lisa Wehrstedt of Insider ranked Leroy & Stitch seventh out of twenty-five films on her list. Werhstedt wrote, "For fans who were really involved with the series [...], this film acts like the perfect finale." However, she also criticized it for "los[ing] a bit of the human charm of the original and the previous [released] sequel."

Soundtrack

Lilo & Stitch Hawaiian Album is the soundtrack to Disney's Leroy & Stitch. The majority of the Leroy & Stitch soundtrack are Elvis Presley records, while other parts of the soundtrack include music inspired by Gustav Holst's "The Planets". The soundtrack also contains score pieces from the original Lilo & Stitch film (which was composed by Alan Silvestri) and from Lilo & Stitch: The Series's pilot film Stitch! The Movie (which was composed by Michael Tavera, who was also the composer for The Series).

Track listing

See also

 Lilo & Stitch: The Series, an animated television spin-off of the animated feature film Lilo & Stitch that preceded this film
 List of Lilo & Stitch: The Series episodes
 Stitch!, an anime spin-off of Lilo & Stitch that succeeded this film

Notes

References

External links

 
 
 
 
 Leroy & Stitch at Keyframe - the Animation Resource

2006 films
2006 animated films
2006 direct-to-video films
2006 television films
2000s American animated films
2000s buddy comedy films
2000s children's animated films
American animated television films
American children's animated comic science fiction films
American sequel films
American television series finales
Animated buddy films
Disney television films
Disney direct-to-video animated films
Animated films about children
Films about cloning
Films based on television series
Films set in Hawaii
Lilo & Stitch (franchise)
Disney Television Animation films
Films directed by Bobs Gannaway
Films directed by Tony Craig (director)
Films scored by J. A. C. Redford
2000s English-language films
Animated films about revenge